Together for Catalonia (Junts) is a Catalan political party established in July 2020 by former Catalan president Carles Puigdemont, announced on 2 July as a result of the foundering of negotiations with the Catalan European Democratic Party (PDeCAT) over the re-organization of the post-convergent political space under the "Together for Catalonia" umbrella. The party's founding congress took place between 25 July and 3 October, after being launched on 18 July with the public presentation of its imagery and corporate identity by Elsa Artadi and Marta Madrenas.

The new Together for Catalonia was formed by the merger of the National Call for the Republic (CNxR), the Action for the Republic (AxR), The Greens–Green Alternative (EV–AV) and splinter elements from the PDeCAT such as Independence Rally (RI.cat), but it also aims at the eventual incorporation of members from the Democrats of Catalonia (DC) and the Popular Unity Candidacy (CUP) parties. The party is to co-exist with the old Together for Catalonia alliance as a result of the Puigdemont–PDeCAT clash over the trademark's property rights, with those of the party having been taken over by the former but the latter still retaining the rights over the electoral coalition and the public funding.

History
The political space of the former Convergence and Union had been left fractured and disorganized after the dissolution of the federation between Democratic Convergence of Catalonia (CDC) and Democratic Union of Catalonia (UDC) in 2015, the former's refoundation into the Catalan European Democratic Party (PDeCAT) in 2016 and the latter's dissolution due to bankruptcy in 2017.

The PDeCAT, comprising the bulk of the so-called "pos-convergent space", had joined into the Together for Catalonia (JxCat) electoral alliance ahead of the 2017 Catalan regional election, called during the enforcement of direct rule over Catalonia and the forced dismissal of Catalan president Carles Puigdemont, who had chosen to self-exile himself in Belgium to escape from the Spanish judiciary. The alliance's success in the election resulted in an increase of influence for Puigdemont within both the PDeCAT and the pro-Catalan independence camp, but his establishment of the National Call for the Republic (CNxR) as a rallying force for pro-independence parties would not achieve the expected results. Concurrently, the PDeCAT registered the trademark of Together for Catalonia as a political party on 11 July 2018, associated to the JxCat alliance but with not separate political activity at the time.

From 2019, negotiations between the PDeCAT and Puigdemont's CNxR would ensue for the reorganization of the post-convergent space under the "Together for Catalonia" umbrella, but the former's insistence on refusing to dissolve itself as a party would lead to Puigdemont breaking ties with the PDeCAT and announcing the foundation of a new party on 2 July 2020, with its founding congress starting telematically on 25 July and scheduled to last until 3 October. The new party's name pick, intending to make use of the "Together for Catalonia" label, sparked another conflict with the PDeCAT as the latter held the ownership rights over the trademark. Puigdemont's supporters within the PDeCAT took it over on 10 July by changing the registration data in the interior ministry to reflect its new ownership, but the change did not affect the electoral coalition comprising the PDeCAT nor its electoral rights, which Puigdemont's party renounced to use.

The new party unveiled its logo and corporate identity on 18 July, presented by Elsa Artadi and Marta Madrenas. Joan Canadell, the president of the Barcelona Chamber of Commerce, voiced his openness to collaborating with the new organization, although he claimed he did not see himself leading a future list at the ballots. Jordi Puigneró, incumbent regional minister of Digital Policies and Public Administration, had been also commented as a potential candidate for Junts in a future regional election in a list to be symbolically led by Puigdemont. The party was joined by Independence Rally (RI.cat) on 24 July, which broke the collaboration agreement under which it had been allied with CDC/PDeCAT since 2013.

From 29 August onwards and starting with the party's five senators, members from the PDeCAT aligned to Puigdemont started defecting en masse from the former, in response to it announcing a formal sue on Puigdemont for taking over the JxCat's brand, with Puigdemont himself forfeiting his PDeCAT membership on 31 August.

Composition

Ideology
The party's overall political stance was laid out in the manifestos launched by independents within the parliamentary Together for Catalonia (JxCat) together with several PDeCAT elected members during the final stages of the failed negotiations between the PDeCAT and Puigdemont. Aside of urging for the reorganization of the post-convergent space under the umbrella of "Together for Catalonia", the manifestos advocated for the defense of the right to self-determination, the unilateral enforcement of the "1 October commitment" to Catalan independence and a goal to "bring together the central current of Catalanism—today mostly pro-independence—with the articulation of a social, economic and modernizing agenda of a country small in size but large in aspirations", while advancing towards democratic souverainism, direct democracy and the fight against corruption.

One of the reasons cited for the breakup of negotiations between the PDeCAT and Puigdemont was on the issue of ideology, as the former—advocating for a project in the political centre ground—considered that Puigdemont's platform had drifted to the left-wing of the political spectrum in recent times. Paris Grau, associate professor of Political and Constitutional System in the University of Barcelona, commented on the new party promoted by Puigdemont by stating that, while it had been common for pro-independence parties to show different levels of support on the issue—ranging from unilateralism to more bilateral solutions inspired by the "Scottish way"—a new, unexpected situation was unveiling as "some of those [parties] who have been representative of the centre-right in Catalonia are increasingly revealing themselves more supportive of appealing to the centre-left or left-wing", in what he considered a clear move to dispute voters to Republican Left of Catalonia (ERC).

In an extraordinary assembly held on 19 July 2020, the small Action for the Republic party voted in favour of urging its members to "individually" join Junts and "actively participate in the process of constituting the new party", ideologically describing Junts as an organization "of progressive values, in the ideological big tent axis of [Catalonia's] centre-left majority, and decidedly republican".

Electoral performance

Parliament of Catalonia

References

2020 establishments in Catalonia
Catalan nationalist parties
Political parties established in 2020
Political parties in Catalonia